Albert Abraham Wolff (31 December 1835, Cologne – 22 December 1891, Paris), was a French writer, dramatist, journalist, and art critic who was born in Germany.

Biography

Wolff graduated from a trade school after teaching in Paris . This was followed by a degree  in Bonn before he settled in Paris in 1857. There he worked as a secretary for Alexandre Dumas. From 1859 he was editor of Le Charivari under the pseudonym Charles Brassac. He moved to Le Figaro where he became a leading art critic and was later promoted to editor of the newspaper. His discussions of the Paris Salon had a great impact of the success of contemporary artists. Wolff supported academic painting, with Jean-Louis-Ernest Meissonier as one of his favourite artists. Moreover he was intensively connected with contemporary French artists, a. o. the painters of the Barbizon School who he visited and interviewed frequently. In his publication of 1886: 'Notes upon certain Masters of the XIX century' Wolff described the French painters whose pictures were exhibited on the exhibition 'Cent Chefs-d'Oeuvres: the Choiche of the French Private Galleries', in Paris, 1883. Wolff opposed Impressionism, although occasionally he praised individual works from this school. He also published detailed observations of Paris in several books and wrote several novels and stage plays. Politically, he opposed antisemitism.

He is buried in cimetière du Père-Lachaise (96th division).

Works
Mémoires de Thérésa, écrits par elle-même, 1865
Mémoires du boulevard, 1866 
Deux empereurs (1870-1871), 1871
Le Tyrol et la Carinthie, mœurs, paysages, légendes, 1872
Victorien Sardou et l'Oncle Sam, avec les documents relatifs à la suppression de la pièce, 1874
Mémoires d'un Parisien : Voyages à travers le monde, 1884 
Mémoires d'un Parisien : La Haute-Noce, 1885 
Mémoires d'un Parisien : L'Écume de Paris, 1885 
Mémoires d'un Parisien : La Gloire à Paris, 1886
La Capitale de l'art, Paris, 1886
Mémoires d'un Parisien : La gloriole, 1888
Figaro-Salon, de 1885 à 1891
Cent chefs-d'œuvre des collections parisiennes, 1888
Theatre
Un homme du sud, à-propos burlesque mixed with distincts, with Henri Rochefort, Paris, théâtre du Palais-Royal, 31 août 1862
Le Dernier Couplet, comédie en 1 acte, Paris, théâtre du Vaudeville, 8 novembre 1862
Les Mystères de l'Hôtel des ventes, comédie-vaudeville en 3 actes, avec Henri Rochefort, Paris, théâtre du Palais-Royal, 27 juin 1863
Les Mémoires de Réséda, souvenirs contemporains, avec Henri Rochefort et Ernest Blum, Paris, théâtre du Palais-Royal, 4 mai 1865
Les Thugs à Paris, revue mêlée de chant, en 3 actes, avec Eugène Grangé, Paris, théâtre des Variétés, 20 novembre 1866
Les Points noirs, comédie en 1 acte, Paris, théâtre du Palais-Royal, 17 avril 1870
Paris en actions, revue en 3 actes, avec Raoul Toché, Paris, théâtre des Nouveautés, 15 décembre 1879
Les Parfums de Paris, revue en 12 tableaux, avec Raoul Toché, Paris, théâtre des Nouveautés, 18 décembre 1880
L'Alouette, comédie en 1 acte, avec Edmond Gondinet, Paris, théâtre du Gymnase-Dramatique, 14 février 1881
La Vente de Tata, vaudeville en 3 actes, avec Alfred Hennequin, Paris, théâtre des Nouveautés, 15 septembre 1881
Egmont, drame lyrique en 4 actes, avec Albert Millaud, musique de Gaston Salvayre, Paris, théâtre de l'Opéra-Comique, 6 décembre 1886
Varia
 Notice biographique publiée en préface des Notes d'un musicien en voyage de Jacques Offenbach, Paris, 1877 Texte en ligne
Correspondance entre Albert Wolff et Marie-Lise B. : un amour romantique, Paris : La Pensée universelle, 1985

Bibliography
Gustave Toudouze, Albert Wolff : histoire d'un chroniqueur parisien, Paris : Victor Havard, 1883 Texte en ligne

References

External links

ZOETROPE STRIPS | LE FIGARO, from stephenherbert.co.uk

19th-century French dramatists and playwrights
French art critics
1835 births
1891 deaths
Burials at Père Lachaise Cemetery
19th-century French journalists
French male journalists
19th-century male writers